The 31st Guangdong-Hong Kong Cup was held in January 2009. Defending champions Hong Kong played against Guangdong at Yuexiushan Stadium on 1 January in the first leg and the second leg was played at Mong Kok Stadium on 4 January. Hong Kong football representative team represented Hong Kong Team this year instead of Hong Kong League XI and 2008 Chinese third-tier league runners-up Guangdong Sunray Cave (Guangdong U19s) replaced Guangzhou FC as Guangdong Team to participate in this tournament. Hong Kong won 5–4 on aggregate and were crowned their 13th Guangdong-Hong Kong Cup champions.

Squads

Guangdong
 Manager: Cao Yang
 Assistant managers: Guan Zhirui, He Weiwen, Zhong Weimin

Hong Kong
 Team Manager: Leung Hung Tak Brian, Pui Kwan Kay, Steven Lo
 Admin Secretary: Lim Fong Kee
 Coach: Goran Paulić, Dejan Antonić
 Goalkeeper Coach: Chu Kwok Kuen 
 Physio: Lui Yat Hong
 Team Assistant: Kwan Kon Sang

Results

References

2009 in Chinese football
2008–09 in Hong Kong football
2008-09